Peerapur or Pirapur is a village in the Jandaha block of Vaishali district in the state of Bihar, India. It is in Tirhut division. It is located more than 31 km from the nearest city of Hajipur and 44 km from the capital Patna. The local language of the village is Maithili. Jagdambe Sthan is very famous temple of the village.

Demographics 
As per the 2011 census, Peerapur has a total population of 5,539 people, with 1,095 households. This village has higher literacy rate compared to Bihar. In 2011, literacy rate of Peerapur village was 73.96% compared to 61.80% of Bihar. In the village Male literacy stands at 80.14% while female literacy rate was 67.19%.

Administration 
Peerapur is a Gram panchayat. The head of the Gram Panchayat is known as Mukhiya.  Peerapur gram panchayat falls under the administrative region of Jandaha Block.

References 

Villages in Vaishali district
Vaishali district